The 2019 FFA Cup Final was the sixth final of the FFA Cup, Australia's main football cup competition and the final match of the 2019 FFA Cup. The match was contested between Adelaide United and Melbourne City, and was held at Coopers Stadium, home of Adelaide United. The home side, Adelaide, defeated City by four goals to nil and recorded their third FFA Cup title, and second in succession.

The match was broadcast live on Fox Sports.

Road to the final

Adelaide United entered the tournament as the reigning champions, having defeated Sydney FC 2–1 in the 2018 Cup Final at home. The Reds were drawn away to high-profile NPL VIC club Melbourne Knights and won 5–2, with Ben Halloran's two goals in that match helping to keep the Knights at bay. In the Round of 16, Adelaide travelled to Brisbane to take on Olympic FC and were in danger of becoming the second A-League club to lose to an NPL club in this year's tournament. Olympic FC drew level with Adelaide twice in the match, before George Blackwood's 84th minute penalty conversion got the Reds over the line. United then met A-League clubs for the remainder of the cup, winning 1–0 against Newcastle Jets at home in the Quarter-final. A come-from-behind Semi-final victory over the Central Coast Mariners was sealed by to a controversial 90th minute goal scored by ex-City footballer Riley McGree. Adelaide United became the first A-League club to qualify for their fourth FFA Cup Final.

Melbourne City's opponent in the round of 32, was NPL SA club Campbelltown City in Adelaide. Goals from Jamie Maclaren and Craig Noone saw Melbourne City victorious by a margin of 3–1. In the round of 16, Melbourne City headed over to Sydney to take NPL NSW club Marconi Stallions. After Jamie Maclaren scored the opening goal in the second minute, Craig Noone would score Melbourne City's second off a flick from Connor Metcalfe to give Melbourne City a 2–0 lead. A late consolation goal wasn't enough for the Stallions, with the final scoreline reading 2–1. The club met Western Sydney Wanderers in the Quarter-finals for the second time in three years and were dominant in a 3–0 win. In their Semi-final tie, City traveled to take on the Brisbane Strikers at Perry Park. Despite conceding the first goal inside the opening five minutes, City won the match 5–1. Striker Jamie Maclaren scored in each match, and entered the final with six goals to his name.

Pre-match

Venue
For the second consecutive year, the host venue was randomly drawn following the conclusion of the semi-finals. Adelaide's home ground of Coopers Stadium was drawn, making it the third time the venue had hosted the showpiece event and for the second consecutive year.

Analysis
Adelaide entered the match as the reigning cup champions and made their fourth appearance in the event. Success would provide the club with their third title, having won the cup in 2014 and 2018. City meanwhile have reached the final once before, in 2016 when they defeated Sydney FC at home to claim the senior men's team first piece of silverware.

The two teams met three days prior in Round 2 of the A-League where City came out on top 2–1 with Jamie Maclaren scoring a brace and Riley McGree scoring Adelaide's only goal.

Match

Details

Statistics

References

External links
 FFA Cup official website

FFA Cup
2019 in Australian soccer
Adelaide United FC matches
Melbourne City FC matches
Soccer in Adelaide
FFA Cup
Sports competitions in Adelaide
2010s in Adelaide
Australia Cup finals